The Biskopsgården Church is a church building in the southern parts of Biskopsgården on the island of Hisingen in Gothenburg, Sweden. Belonging to the Lundby of the Church of Sweden, it was opened in 1961. It was originally called the Southern Biskopsgården Church before the Northern Biskopsgården Church was taken out of use in 2004.

References

External links

20th-century Church of Sweden church buildings
Churches in Gothenburg
Churches completed in 1961
1961 establishments in Sweden
Churches in the Diocese of Gothenburg